Diodorus of Adramyttium,is a rhetorician and Academic philosopher. He is known only from the account given by Strabo. He lived at the time of Mithridates (1st century BC), under whom he commanded an army. In order to please the king, he caused all the senators of his native place to be massacred. He afterwards accompanied Mithridates to Pontus, and, after the fall of the king, Diodorus received the punishment for his cruelty. Charges were brought against him at Adramyttium, and as he felt that he could not clear himself, he starved himself to death in despair.

Notes

Academic philosophers
Ancient Greek rhetoricians
Hellenistic generals
1st-century BC Greek people
1st-century BC philosophers
Hellenistic-era philosophers from Anatolia